Brage Skaret (born 28 April 2002) is a Norwegian football defender who plays for Fredrikstad.

He started his career in Skedsmo FK and got his senior debut in 2017 before joining the junior ranks of Vålerenga. He was promoted to the senior squad in 2020 and made his Eliteserien debut in December 2020 against Start. He started his first match in May 2021 against Molde.

He signed for Fredrikstad in August 2022.

References

External links
 

2002 births
Living people
People from Skedsmo
Norwegian footballers
Vålerenga Fotball players
Fredrikstad FK players
Eliteserien players
Norwegian First Division players
Association football defenders
Sportspeople from Viken (county)